University of Science, Arts and Technology (USAT) is an offshore private medical school located near Olveston, Montserrat. The university opened in 2003 with administrative headquarters in  Colorado and its campus located in Montserrat. The school has graduates practicing in both the United States and worldwide and admits both domestic and foreign students.

Accreditation
The medical school of the University of Science, Arts and Technology is not yet accredited by the Caribbean Accreditation Authority for Education in Medicine and other Health Professions (CAAM-HP).  Students from 2003 to 2018 that graduate before 2019 can apply for their ECFMG Certification but those after 2019 and presently attending will be held to extreme measures before obtaining ECFMG certification.

The school was listed by the Foundation for Advancement of International Medical Education and Research (FAIMER) but FAIMER does not accredit medical training institutions.  The Global Health Workforce Alliance of the World Health Organization (WHO) states that the school has been "fully accredited by the Ministry of Education of Montserrat" since 2003. In addition, the school is included in the WHO's World Directory of Medical Schools.

References

Education in Montserrat
Educational organisations based in Montserrat
Medical schools in the Caribbean
Universities and colleges in British Overseas Territories